Faisal bin Musaid Al Saud (Fayṣal bin Musāʿid ʾĀl Suʿūd; 4 April 194418 June 1975) was the assassin and nephew of King Faisal of Saudi Arabia.

Early life 
Faisal bin Musa'id was born in 1944. His father was Prince Musa'id bin Abdulaziz, son of the founder of Saudi Arabia and half-brother to all the six Saudi kings, including King Faisal, who have succeeded the founder. Faisal bin Musa'id's mother was Watfa, a daughter of Muhammad bin Talāl, the 12th and last Rashidi emir. Musa'id and Wafta were divorced when Faisal was still young. Therefore, he and his siblings were much closer to their maternal Rashidi relatives than to their paternal Al Saud relatives.

In 1965, Faisal's older brother Khaled was shot and killed by a Saudi police officer while he led an assault on a new television station in Riyadh that had been recently founded by King Faisal. Some people opposed the establishment of a national television service, as they believed it immoral to produce images of humans. While that is the official version, the details of his death are disputed and some reports allege that he actually died resisting arrest outside his own home. Regardless, no investigation over his death was ever initiated.
Faisal had two other full siblings, Prince Bandar and Princess Al Jawhara. Saudi businessman Abdul Rahman bin Musa'id Al Saud is his half-brother.

Education 
Faisal arrived in the United States in 1966 and attended San Francisco State College for two semesters studying English. Allis Bens, director of the American Language Institute at San Francisco State, said, "He was friendly and polite and very well brought up, it seemed to me." While Faisal was at San Francisco State, his brother Khaled was killed. After leaving San Francisco State College, Faisal went to the University of California, Berkeley and then to the University of Colorado Boulder. He was described by his peers as "[a] quiet, likable, notably unstudious young man". University of Colorado Professor Edward Rozek, who had taught him in three comparative government courses, described him as "academically a D and a C student".

In 1969, while in Boulder, he was arrested for conspiring to sell LSD. He pleaded guilty and was placed on probation for one year. In May 1970, the district attorney dropped the charges.

In 1971, he received a bachelor's degree in political science from the University of Colorado and then returned to the San Francisco Bay area. At the University of California, Berkeley, he enrolled in graduate courses in political science, but did not receive a master's degree.

After the United States 
After leaving the United States, he went to Beirut. For unknown reasons, he also went to East Germany. When he came back to Saudi Arabia, Saudi authorities seized his passport because of his troubles abroad. He began teaching at Riyadh University and kept in touch with his girlfriend, Christine Surma, who was 26 at the time of the assassination. Surma viewed the Saudi interest "in achieving peace with Israel" as a positive outcome "not available with the previous ruler King Faisal".

Assassination and trial

Royal Palace shooting 
On 25 March 1975, Prince Faisal went to the Royal Palace in Riyadh, where King Faisal was holding a meeting, known as a majlis. He joined a Kuwaiti delegation and lined up to meet the king. The king recognized his nephew and bent his head forward, so that the younger Faisal could kiss the king's head in a sign of respect. The prince took out a revolver from his robe and shot the King twice in the head. His third shot missed and he threw the gun away. King Faisal fell to the floor. Bodyguards with swords and submachine guns arrested the prince. The king was quickly rushed to a hospital but doctors were unable to save him. Saudi television crews captured the entire assassination on camera.

Imprisonment and execution 
Initial reports described Faisal bin Musaid as "mentally deranged". He was moved to a Riyadh prison. However, he was later deemed sane to be tried.

A sharia court found Faisal guilty of the king's murder on 18 June, and his public execution occurred hours later. Cars with loudspeakers drove around Riyadh publicly announcing the verdict and his imminent execution, and crowds gathered in the square. Faisal was led by a soldier to the execution point and was reported to have walked unsteadily. Wearing white robes and blindfolded, Faisal was beheaded with a single sweep of a gold-handled sword.

Motives 
Aside from the death of his brother, his other possible motivations remain unknown, but other motives have been proposed. Saudi officials began to state that the prince's actions were deliberate and planned. Rumours suggested that the prince had told his mother about his assassination plans, who in turn told King Faisal who responded that "if it is Allah's will, then it would happen".

Arab media implied that the prince had been an agent of the U.S. Central Intelligence Agency and Israel’s Mossad.
Following these types of claims, a theory started in Iranian media mentioned that he might have been manipulated by his Western girlfriend (Christine Surma) who, it was alleged, might have been Jewish and secretly an asset for the Israeli intelligence services. The rumor was briefly taken seriously by Saudi Arabian officials who informally contacted Surma to question her regarding the assassination at which point she revealed she was not Jewish and that she was as puzzled as everyone else regarding the actions of Faisal.

Beirut newspapers offered three different explanations for the attack. An-Nahar reported that the attack may have been possible vengeance for the dethroning of King Saud, because Faisal was scheduled to marry Saud's daughter, Princess Sita, in the same week. An-Nahar also reported that King Faisal had ignored his repeated complaints that his $3,500 monthly allowance ($16,700/month in 2020 dollars, $200,500/year) was insufficient and this may have prompted the assassination. Al Bayrak reported that according to reliable Saudi sources, King Faisal prohibited him from leaving the country because of his excessive consumption of alcohol and other drugs and the attack may have been a retaliation against the ban.

References

Further reading 
 
 
 
 

20th-century executions by Saudi Arabia
1944 births
1975 deaths
Executed assassins
Executed royalty
Executed Saudi Arabian people
Faisal
Academic staff of King Saud University
People convicted of murder by Saudi Arabia
People executed by Saudi Arabia by decapitation
Regicides
San Francisco State University alumni
Saudi Arabian assassins
Saudi Arabian people convicted of murder
University of Colorado alumni